{{Speciesbox
| image = Aphanius fasciatus male.jpg
| status = LC 
| status_system = IUCN3.1
| status_ref = 
| taxon = Aphanius fasciatus
| authority = (Valenciennes, 1821)
| synonyms = *Cyprinodon fasciatus (Valenciennes, 1821) 
Lebias fasciatus Valenciennes, 1821 
Ciprinoides nanofasciatus Nardo, 1824 
Aphanius nanus Nardo, 1827 
Aphanius fasciatus Nardo, 1827 
Lebias lineatopunctata Wagner, 1828 
Aphanius lineatopunctatus (Wagner, 1828) 
Lebias sarda Wagner, 1828 
Aphanius sarda (Wagner, 1828) 
Poecilia calaritana Cuvier, 1829 
Aphanius calaritanus (Cuvier, 1829) 
Cyprinodon calaritanus (Cuvier, 1829) 
Lebias calaritana (Cuvier, 1829) 
Lebias calaritanus (Cuvier, 1829) 
Lebias flava Costa, 1838 
Aphanius flavus (Costa, 1838) 
Lebias nigropunctata Schinz, 1840 
Lebias nigropunctata Bonaparte, 1841 
Aphanius nigropunctata (Bonaparte, 1841) 
Cyprinodon moseas Valenciennes, 1846 
Aphanius moseasv (Valenciennes, 1846) Cyprinodon hammonis Valenciennes, 1846 Aphanius hammonis (Valenciennes, 1846) Cyprinodon cyanogaster Guichenot, 1859 Aphanius cyanogaster (Guichenot, 1859) Cyprinodon doliatus Guichenot, 1859 Aphanius doliatus (Guichenot, 1859) Micromugil timidus Gulia, 1861 Aphanius timidus (Gulia, 1861) Micromugil macrogaster Gulia, 1861Aphanius desioi (Gianferrari, 1933)
| synonyms_ref = 
}}

The Mediterranean killifish, Mediterranean banded killifish or South European toothcarp (Aphanius fasciatus'') is a species of fish in the family Cyprinodontidae. It is found in Albania, Algeria, Bosnia and Herzegovina, Croatia, Cyprus, Egypt, France, Greece, Israel, Italy, Lebanon, Libya, Malta, Morocco, Montenegro, Slovenia, Syria, Tunisia, and Turkey. Its natural habitats are saline lakes, saline marshes, and coastal saline lagoons.

References

Aphanius
Taxonomy articles created by Polbot
Taxa named by Achille Valenciennes
Fish described in 1821